Sarcohyla floresi is a frog in the family Hylidae, endemic to Mexico.  Scientists have seen it between 1461 and 2000 meters above sea level.

This frog has stream-dwelling tadpoles.  The adult frogs have a dark dorsolateral stripe bordered in white.

References

floresi
Frogs of North America
Endemic amphibians of Mexico
Amphibians described in 2020
Fauna of the Sierra Madre del Sur